Municipal Left can refer to the following political parties:
 Municipal Left (Laxå), in Laxå Municipality, Sweden
 Municipal Left (Mariestad), in Mariestad Municipality, Sweden